This list includes properties and districts listed on the California Historical Landmark listing in Ventura County, California. Click the "Map of all coordinates" link to the right to view a Google map of all properties and districts with latitude and longitude coordinates in the table below.

|}

See also 

 List of California Historical Landmarks
 National Register of Historic Places listings in Ventura County, California
 Ventura County Historic Landmarks & Points of Interest
 City of Ventura Historic Landmarks and Districts

References 

.
.
List of California Historical Landmarks
H01
.
H01
History of Southern California